Neria R. Douglass (born 1952) is an American attorney and politician who served as State Treasurer of Maine.  Priorly, she served as State Auditor and also represented Auburn in the Maine Senate. She is a member of the Democratic Party.

Career 
Douglass was the chair of the Auburn School Committee from 1989 to 1994, and she served on the Auburn City Council from 1994 to 1998.

Douglass began her term as State Treasurer on January 7, 2013. Douglass stated after being sworn in that she hopes to persuade Governor Paul LePage to authorize the sale of voter-approved bonds, something which LePage has said he won't do until the State's financial picture improves.

Maine Democrats nominated Douglass to serve a second term, but the Legislature selected the nominee suggested by Republicans, Teresea Hayes, a former Democrat.

References

1952 births
Living people
Politicians from Boston
Politicians from Auburn, Maine
Democratic Party Maine state senators
Women state legislators in Maine
State treasurers of Maine
Maine lawyers
School board members in Maine
Maine city council members
Maine State Auditors
Lawyers from Boston
Women city councillors in Maine
21st-century American women politicians
21st-century American politicians
Women state constitutional officers of Maine